LVR can mean:

Lyon Villeurbanne Rugby
Loan to value ratio
Longitudinal Video Recording
Latvian ruble, the currency of Latvia from 1919 to 1922 and from 1992 to 1993
Large Volume Receiver (see Postcodes in Australia)
Lietuvos vietinė rinktinė (Lithuanian Territorial Defense Force)
Las Vegas Raiders, an American football team in the NFL

Transport
Lehigh Valley Railroad
Lachlan Valley Railway
Lavender MRT station, Singapore (MRT station abbreviation)
Aviavilsa, Lithuania (ICAO airline code)
Lucas do Rio Verde Airport (IATA code)

See also
LVRS can mean Lung Volume Reduction Surgery